Lazar Popovski (born 19 May 1975 in Skopje, SR Macedonia, SFR Yugoslavia) is a Macedonian whitewater kayaker, and a four-time Olympian.

He competed at the 2004 Summer Olympics in Athens. In the K-1 event he finished sixth in the qualification round, thus progressing to the semifinals. In the semifinals he finished sixteenth, failing to reach the top ten and the final round.

He had previously competed at the 2000 Summer Olympics, 1996 Summer Olympics and also at the 1992 Summer Olympics as an Independent Olympic Participant.

Lazar Popovski is well known Macedonian whitewater kayaker competing at four editions of Olympic Games in Barcelona, Atlanta, Sydney and Athens.

He also got the honor to be a National flag bearer at Sydney Olympics.

His journey to this acclaim started in Matka on the river Treska,  where his father, a former slalom and downriver National Champion taught him about the first paddle strokes and kayak adventures.

Trained from a young age in the spirit of Olympic Values, Lazar finished Faculty of Economics in his home town Skopje and acquired an MBA degree from a University of Louisville, Kentucky, USA. There he perfected many of the skills that he later executed through his professional career.

His focus and efforts to promote and improve the status of athletes was recognized and he's was the first Chairman of the Athletes Commission of the Macedonian Olympic Committee.

Later he's got an opportunity to be a Director of the Agency of Youth and Sports the highest governmental body for sports in North Macedonia.

Under his leadership the National sport academy was established and the National sports award was incorporated.

He then progressed as a Chief Human Resources Officer in Makedonski Telekom, a member of Deutsche Telekom Group running many projects that helped transformation of the company towards the current trend of digitization.

Lazar manages the Kayak Adventures, a subsidiary of the family owned company offering kayak training, trips as well as other outdoor activities.

This year Lazar brought his team of kayaking adventures in Korab, Trnica where he shares his enthusiasm on the lake Mavrovo and the beautiful river Radika through stand up paddling-SUP, rafting and survival course and trips.

References

1975 births
Living people
Macedonian male canoeists
Canoeists at the 1992 Summer Olympics
Canoeists at the 1996 Summer Olympics
Canoeists at the 2000 Summer Olympics
Canoeists at the 2004 Summer Olympics
Olympic canoeists as Independent Olympic Participants
Olympic canoeists of North Macedonia
Sportspeople from Skopje